Lysosomal alpha-glucosidase may refer to:
 Glucan 1,4-a-glucosidase, an enzyme
 Acid alpha-glucosidase, an enzyme